Operation Walnut was a military operation conducted by the Allies, notably the Netherlands East Indies Forces Intelligence Service, on the Aroe Islands during World War II. It took place in three phases:
Walnut I - a party of two landed in July 1942 and returned in September
Walnut II - party of two landed in February 1943 and captured August, presumed killed
Walnut III - On 12 July 1943 a reconnaissance patrol consisting of ten, WALNUT III was inserted on Djieo, a small island north of Enoe Island, using Hoehn military folboats. Their fate is unknown, presumed killed.

References

Further reading

Military operations involving the Netherlands
Military operations of World War II involving Australia